Aag Aur Shola ( Fire & Flames) is a 1986 Indian Hindi-language action romance film, produced by Prasan Kapoor under the Tirupati Pictures Enterprises banner, written by Kader Khan and directed by K. Bapaiah. It stars Jeetendra, Sridevi, Mandakini, and Ashish Chanana, with music composed by Laxmikant–Pyarelal. The film was a remake of the Tamil film Uyirullavarai Usha.

Plot
Aag Aur Shola is the story of love, eternal and immortal. It also the story of hatred, the kind of hatred, the existence of which shall remain till the existence of this world. Poor Raju (Ashish Channa) loved Usha (Mandakini), but she proudly refused to reciprocate. Nagesh (Shakti Kapoor), brother of Usha was a rogue. When he learned that Raju loved Usha, he attacked Raju and beat him like a beast. In spite of all this, the fire of love for Usha was still burning in his heart.

On the other side, Nagesh was furious and wanted to kill Raju if he was still adamant. Raju had no other alternative than to go to Vishal for help. Golden-hearted Vishal (Jeetendra) was not only generous but in strength, he was like a rock. Vishal's past resembled Raju's present. He had played with fire and had lost his beloved Aarti (Sridevi). Raju also was playing with fire and would meet with the same fate, but Vishal was now determined to help Raju. This news was like adding fuel to the fire. Nagesh would marry Usha with the boy of his choice, but on the other side, Vishal had promised Raju to get him married with Usha only. This was a great challenge for both Nagesh and Vishal. It was with all his sympathies to Raju on one side and the tyrant Nagesh on the other side and there in between them were the innocent lovers.

Cast

Jeetendra as Vishal
Sridevi as Aarti
Ashish Channa as Raju
Mandakini as Usha
Shakti Kapoor as Nagesh
Kadar Khan as College Lecturer Chogamal Hoshiyarpuri
Asrani as Micheal
Jagdeep as Laddan
Viju Khote as Police Constable
Suresh Oberoi as Aarti's mamaji
Shoma Anand as Usha's elder sister
Bindu as Aarti's mamiji
Aruna Irani as Raju's Bua
Manik Irani as Jumbo
Guddi Maruti as Collegian
Yunus Parvez as Aarti's Groom
Satish Shah as Vidyasagar
Dalip Tahil as Inspector Ram

Soundtrack
The music composed by Laxmikant-Pyarelal and songs written by Anand Bakshi.

References

External links
 

1986 films
1980s Hindi-language films
Films directed by K. Bapayya
Films scored by Laxmikant–Pyarelal
Hindi remakes of Tamil films